Still on the Planet (also released as Godfather of Vocalese) is an album by vocalist Eddie Jefferson recorded in 1976 and released on the Muse label.

Reception

In his review for AllMusic, Scott Yanow stated: "The innovative scat singer and vocalese lyricist was having a comeback during his final years, teaming up with altoist Richie Cole for spirited performances."

Track listing
 "I Got the Blues" (Lester Young, Eddie Jefferson) – 5:33	
 "Workshop (Blues for a Debutante)" (Jefferson) – 2:57
 "Sherry" (Hank Crawford, Jefferson) – 3:20
 "Ornithology" (Charlie Parker, Benny Harris, Jefferson) – 8:17	
 "Keep Walkin'" (Celia Ferguson, Jefferson) – 5:38
 "Zap! Carnivorous" (Mickey Tucker, Jefferson) – 6:19
 "Pinetop's Boogie" (Pinetop Smith, Jefferson) – 3:17
 "Chameleon" (Herbie Hancock, Paul Jackson, Bennie Maupin, Harvey Mason, Jefferson) – 4:32
 "Chameleon" [alternate take] (Hancock, Jackson, Maupin, Mason, Jefferson) – 5:07 Additional track on CD release

Personnel
Eddie Jefferson – vocals
Waymon Reed – trumpet, flugelhorn 
Richie Cole – alto saxophone
Mickey Tucker – keyboards
Rick Laird – bass 
Eddie Gladden – drums

References

1976 albums
Eddie Jefferson albums
Muse Records albums
Albums produced by Bob Porter (record producer)